Jakub Kučera (born 28 January 1997) is a Czech football player who currently plays for FC Hradec Králové.

Club career

FC Zbrojovka Brno
He made his professional debut for Zbrojovka Brno against Dukla Praha on 19 March 2016, where he came in the game as a substitute for Milan Lutonský in the 88th minute.

References

External links
 Profile at FC Zbrojovka Brno official site
 Profile at FAČR official site
 
 

1997 births
Living people
Czech footballers
Czech First League players
FC Zbrojovka Brno players
Association football midfielders
MFK Vítkovice players
1. SC Znojmo players
FK Blansko players
SK Líšeň players
Czech National Football League players
Footballers from Brno
FC Hradec Králové players
Czech Republic youth international footballers